The 1974–75 season was the 76th completed season of The Football League.

Dave Mackay guided Derby County to their second league title in four years having overcome strong competition from Liverpool, Ipswich Town, Everton, Stoke City, Sheffield United and Middlesbrough in a title race which went right to the wire. There was disappointment at Bramall Lane after Sheffield United's title challenge ended in a failure without even a UEFA Cup place, but this would be as good as it got for the Blades as a sharp decline soon set in and within a few seasons had pushed them into the Fourth Division.

Carlisle United, in the First Division for the first time, topped the league three games into the season but were unable to keep up their winning ways and were relegated in bottom place. Joining the Cumbrians in the drop zone were Luton Town and Chelsea.

Brian Clough was named as Don Revie's successor at Leeds United but left after just 44 days in charge. He was replaced by Jimmy Armfield.

Manchester United's directors kept faith in Tommy Docherty after their relegation to the Second Division, and he rewarded them with the Second Division championship to return them to the top flight. They were joined by Aston Villa (who also won the League Cup) and Norwich City. Docherty had built a new-look team containing players such as Jim Holton, Stuart Pearson and Brian Greenhoff. Meanwhile, FIFA finally lifted George Best's worldwide ban from football; however, Docherty was not prepared to give him another chance at Old Trafford and he joined Stockport County on a free transfer.

Millwall, Cardiff City and Sheffield Wednesday were the three unlucky clubs who were unable to escape the Second Division drop zone. In the space of a few years, Sheffield Wednesday had slumped to the Third Division having previously been a strong First Division side.

Blackburn Rovers, Plymouth Argyle and Charlton Athletic occupied the three promotion places in the Third Division.

Going down were AFC Bournemouth, Tranmere Rovers, Watford and Huddersfield Town. This meant that Huddersfield would be playing Fourth Division football for the first time in their history, the first former English champions so to do. Watford, meanwhile, were enduring their last unsuccessful season for many years to come.

Mansfield Town, Shrewsbury Town, Rotherham United and Chester occupied the four promotion places in the Fourth Division. Chester had finally managed promotion after 44 years of league membership, narrowly edging out Lincoln City on goal average.

Scunthorpe United, who had narrowly missed out on top-division football during the 1960s, found themselves bottom of the league but retained their league status after being re-elected along with the three clubs placed above them.

Final league tables and results

The tables and results below are reproduced here in the exact form that they can be found at The Rec.Sport.Soccer Statistics Foundation website and in Rothmans Book of Football League Records 1888–89 to 1978–79, with home and away statistics separated.

Beginning with the season 1894–95, clubs finishing level on points were separated according to goal average (goals scored divided by goals conceded), or more properly put, goal ratio. In case one or more teams had the same goal difference, this system favoured those teams who had scored fewer goals. The goal average system was eventually scrapped beginning with the 1976–77 season.

Since the Fourth Division was established in the 1958–59 season, the bottom four teams of that division have been required to apply for re-election.

First Division

A tight title race saw just five points separating the top seven sides, with Derby County finally winning the title in their first full season under the management of Dave Mackay. Liverpool finished runners-up under Bob Paisley, who had succeeded the legendary Bill Shankly at the start of the season. Ipswich Town, Everton, Stoke City, Sheffield United and newly promoted Middlesbrough completed the top seven.

Despite the close nature of the final table; most pundits had dubbed Everton Champions elect going into the closing stages. The Merseysiders had lost just four games all season, topped the table and appeared to have a relatively trouble-free run-in mostly against teams in the bottom half of the table. The pressure of the title being theirs to lose appeared to get to the Toffeemen who inexplicably lost four of their last nine games, three of which, against Luton, Carlisle, who would ultimately be relegated, and Sheffield United in a game they had led 2-0 in at half time, ultimately costing them the title. Liverpool also came within a hair's breadth of the title, with a 1-0 loss at Middlesbrough in the penultimate game of the season proving their undoing.

Leeds United began life without Don Revie in disastrous fashion, with Brian Clough being sacked after 44 days in charge, having won just one league game. His successor Jimmy Armfield dragged them up to ninth place in the final table and also took them to their first European Cup final, but they were on the losing side and a riot by their fans saw them banned from European competitions for three years. Arsenal finished a disappointing 16th in the league, one of their lowest finishes in more than half a century of unbroken First Division membership. Their North London rivals Tottenham Hotspur finished just one place and one point above the relegation zone. Luton Town's First Division comeback ended in relegation after just one season, while financial problems contributed to Chelsea's relegation and the end of their 12-year run in the First Division. Carlisle United had an incredible start to their first season in the First Division, topping the league after winning their first three games, but were eventually relegated in bottom place.

Results

Maps

Second Division

Tommy Docherty rewarded the loyalty of the Manchester United directors who kept faith in him after their first relegation in nearly 40 years by delivering an instant return to the First Division as his exciting young side were crowned champions of the Second Division. Aston Villa - with arguably an even more exciting side - ended their eight-year absence from the top flight by finishing runners-up, being divisional top scorers and also lifting the League Cup, in the final of which they beat Norwich City, who finished third in the league and so clinched the final promotion place.

Sunderland and Bristol City just missed out on promotion, while ninth placed Fulham partly compensated for a lack of a serious promotion challenge by reaching their first ever FA Cup final, although they lost to West Ham United. Nottingham Forest looked to build for a better future and end their spell of Second Division struggle by appointing Brian Clough as manager in January.

Sheffield Wednesday were relegated to the Third Division for the first time in their history after a terrible season in which they managed only five league wins. They finished 14 points adrift of safety and went down along with Millwall and Cardiff City.

Results

Maps

Third Division

Results

Maps

Fourth Division

Results

Maps

See also
1974–75 in English football

References

Ian Laschke: Rothmans Book of Football League Records 1888–89 to 1978–79. Macdonald and Jane's, London & Sydney, 1980.

 
English Football League seasons